Euhuascaraya is a genus of parasitic flies in the family Tachinidae. There are at least four described species in Euhuascaraya.

Species
These four species belong to the genus Euhuascaraya:
 Euhuascaraya atra Townsend, 1927
 Euhuascaraya media Curran, 1947
 Euhuascaraya nemo Curran, 1947
 Euhuascaraya siesta Curran, 1947

References

Further reading

 
 
 
 

Tachinidae
Articles created by Qbugbot